is a racing arcade game which was released by Namco in 1994. It is the fifth game in the Final Lap series, and was licensed by FOCA to Fuji Television (as shown on its title screen). Like its predecessors, it allows up to eight players to play simultaneously when four two-player cabinets are linked together (but Player 4 and 8's car is now affiliated with Benetton replacing Tyrrell from the previous game) - and it also features four new tracks set in Germany, Hungary, Belgium and Brazil.

Reception
In Japan, Game Machine listed Final Lap R in its March 15, 1994 issue as being the country's third most popular upright arcade game at the time. It went on to be the eighth highest-grossing dedicated arcade game of 1995 in Japan.

A reviewer for the French publication Consoles Plus described it as "the swan song of 2D F1 simulation games", and admired its graphics and fast-paced gameplay.

References

External links

Final Lap R at Arcade History

1993 video games
Arcade video games
Arcade-only video games
Namco arcade games
Racing video games
Sports video games set in Germany
Video game sequels
Video games developed in Japan
Video games set in Germany
Video games set in Hungary
Video games set in Belgium
Video games set in Brazil
Formula One video games
Multiplayer and single-player video games